Fennimore Store is a historic commercial building located at Leipsic, Kent County, Delaware.  It was built between 1840 and 1860, and is a two-story, hipped roofed frame structure clad in weatherboard siding. It features a full-width porch on two sides.  It is representative of mid-19th-century commercial vernacular architecture.  It has housed a general store, grocery and gas station, muskrat skinner's store and antique shop at various periods.

It was listed on the National Register of Historic Places in 1982.

References

Commercial buildings completed in 1860
Buildings and structures in Kent County, Delaware
Gas stations on the National Register of Historic Places in Delaware
National Register of Historic Places in Kent County, Delaware
Leipsic, Delaware